Pseudocordylus transvaalensis (also known as the northern crag lizard) is a species of lizard in the family Cordylidae. It is a small lizard found in South Africa.

References

Pseudocordylus
Reptiles of South Africa
Reptiles described in 1943
Taxa named by Vivian Frederick Maynard FitzSimons